The 2022 Emperor's Cup (Emperor's Cup JFA 102nd Japan Football Championship (Japanese: 天皇杯 JFA 第102回全日本サッカー選手権大会)) was the 102nd edition of the annually contested cup, taking place from 21 May to 16 October. The final was played at the Nissan Stadium, in Yokohama, Kanagawa Prefecture. It was the first time the stadium hosted an Emperor's Cup final since 2014.

The 2022 Emperor's Cup followed a different pattern to the previous three editions of the tournament, being restored to its old, usual format, which was applied for the last time in the 2018 Emperor's Cup. It features 88 teams, representing the prefectural football associations, the J1 League, and the J2 League. Honda FC was awarded a seeded entry as the JFA's annually specially-designated amateur club, in order to turn the quantity of teams in the First Round to an even number. 

Urawa Red Diamonds were the defending champions. They were eliminated by Thespakusatsu Gunma in the third round. Ventforet Kofu won their first major title and qualified for the 2023–24 AFC Champions League group stage.

Calendar
The schedule was announced on 21 December 2021. The first round of the tournament was played on Saturdays and Mondays. From the second round to the semi-finals, the matches were played on Wednesdays, and the final on a Sunday. The final was moved to mid-October due to the 2022 FIFA World Cup, in which the Japan national team is participating, being held in November and December, making it difficult for the 2022 Emperor's Cup Final to be held on the first day of the following year, as per the usual practice.

Participating clubs
In parentheses: the amount of times each team qualified for the Emperor's Cup (appearance in the 2022 Emperor's Cup included)

Note

Qualifying rounds
As only J1 and J2 League clubs qualify directly for the First Round, the other Emperor's Cup candidate teams (exception being made to the JFA-seeded teams), have to undergo a prefectural qualification, with regulaments and schedules varying from one association to another. In total, there are 47 prefectural cup qualifications, with the winners of each prefectural cup earning their right to play in the First Round of the Emperor's Cup. This year, a total of 2,342 teams played in the aforementioned prefectural qualifications. The following boxes shows each result of the 47 prefectural finals of the 2022 Emperor's Cup Prefectural Qualification Cup.

First round
The opening round of the 2022 Emperor's Cup with the 47 Prefectural Cup Final winners and a specially-seeded amateur team (Honda FC) was played from 21 to 22 May, with 23 May being the alternative match-playing date, if the match needed by any reason to be rescheduled.

Second round
The matches on this round were played from 1 June to 8 June; 29 matches were played on 1 June and 3 matches on 8 June. Despite it being a professional league, the J3 League teams were not awarded a direct spot in this round, meaning that they had to undergo a prefectural qualification and win their first round matches to qualify for the second round. The direct spots were reserved to J1 League, and J2 League teams.

Third round
On 8 June 2022, all the teams in this round were confirmed, after all the remaining matches from the Second round came to an end. Match venues for the round were announced on 3 June 2022. Out of the four Japanese teams who got qualified for the 2022 AFC Champions League, only Vissel Kobe qualified for the second round.

Round of 16
The match venues for the 4th round were announced on 22 June 2022, and the kick-off times were announced on 30 June 2022.

Quarter-finals
A draw was conducted to determine the matchups of the quarter-final stage and onwards, on 15 July, and all the teams on the round were made known on 20 July. Six of the teams featuring in this round play in the J1 League, while the other 2, Tokyo Verdy and Ventforet Kofu, play in the J2 League.

Semi-finals
Three teams from the J1, and one team from the J2, survived until the semi-finals. Sanfrecce Hiroshima qualified to the semi-finals while sitting as J1's 2nd-placed team, Kashima Antlers as J1's 4th-place, and Kyoto Sanga as J1's 13th-place, one point off the relegation zone.  Kick-off times, broadcaster, and venues were released by JFA on 16 September.  Both matches were broadcast on NHK BS1 in Japan.

Final

Top scorers

References

External links
Emperors Cup 2022, JFA.jp

Emperor's Cup
Japan
2022 in Japanese football